Guy Victor Howard (November 28, 1879August 20, 1954) was an American politician.

Early life
Guy Victor Howard was born in Minneapolis, Minnesota in 1879. He attended public schools, Minneapolis School of Business, and Georgetown University in Washington, D.C. Howard served as a clerk in the post office in the United States House of Representatives from 1897 to 1901. He worked in the insurance business in Minneapolis in 1901, and was a presidential elector on the Republican ticket in 1916.

United States Senate
Howard was elected on November 3, 1936,  to the United States Senate from Minnesota as a Republican. He was elected to fill the vacancy caused by the death of Thomas D. Schall and served from November 4, 1936, to January 3, 1937, in the 74th congress. He did not seek election for the full term beginning in 1937.

Later life
After the Senate, Howard returned to the insurance business and died in Minneapolis on August 20, 1954. He was interred in Lakewood Cemetery.

External links 
 
 

1879 births
1954 deaths
Republican Party United States senators from Minnesota
Minnesota Republicans